"Can We Pretend" is a song recorded by American singer Pink for her eighth studio album, Hurts 2B Human (2019). The track was initially released as the second promotional single on April 11, 2019 but later sent to radio on April 22, 2019 as the album's second single. It was the most added single to radio in Australia the following week.

"Can We Pretend" was written by Pink, Ryan Tedder, Jean Paul Makhlouf, Alex Makhlouf, Samuel Frisch, while the production was handled by Cash Cash and Ryan Tedder.

Release 
The official lyric video of "Can We Pretend" was released on April 11, 2019. An animated music video directed and drawn by JonJon was released on June 28, 2019. On the same day an official remix by Sigala was released.

Live performances 
Since its release, "Can We Pretend" has been included in the setlist of the 2019 leg of her Beautiful Trauma World Tour.

Track listing
Remix single
 "Can We Pretend" (Sigala Remix) – 3:05

Can We Pretend (The Remixes) [Featuring Cash Cash]
 "Can We Pretend" (MOTi Remix) – 2:57
 "Can We Pretend" (Hook n Sling Remix) – 3:10
 "Can We Pretend" (Yves V Remix) – 2:33 
 "Can We Pretend" (Bart B More Remix) – 4:09

Charts

Weekly charts

Year-end charts

Certifications

Release history

References

2019 singles
2019 songs
Pink (singer) songs
Cash Cash songs
Songs written by Pink (singer)
Songs written by Ryan Tedder
Song recordings produced by Ryan Tedder
RCA Records singles